The Hongshui River  is a major river in the Guangxi Zhuang Autonomous Region in Southern China. It is one of the main rivers in the basin of the Xi River, which in its turn is one of the main tributaries of the Pearl River. Because it flows through the red rock series area, the river is reddish brown, hence the name Hongshui River.

Conventionally, the Hongshui River is formed by the merging of the Beipan and Nanpan Rivers (Beipanjiang and Nanpanjiang, i.e., the Northern and Southern Pan Rivers) at the Guizhou-Guangxi border. From there, it flows in the general southeastern direction. In Laibin Prefecture in central Guangxi the Hongshui merges with the Liu River that comes from the north, forming the Qian River, which continues to the east toward, eventually, the Xi River.

The Hongshui has 10 large dams on it, that provide electric power and flood control.

According to the Beijing Review the Hongshui River had 300 shoals that interfered with navigating the river with cargo vessels.
Several of the dams are equipped with ship lifts capable of lifting vessels of 300 tons displacement.

References

Rivers of Guangxi
Tributaries of the Pearl River (China)